The 2011 North Alabama Lions football team represented the University of North Alabama in the 2011 NCAA Division II football season.

Schedule

References

North Alabama
North Alabama Lions football seasons
North Alabama Lions football